William Bayly may refer to:

 William Bayly (astronomer) (1737–1810), English astronomer
 William Bayly (barrister) (1540–1612), English barrister and politician
 William Alfred Bayly (1906–1934), New Zealand farmer and convicted murderer
 W. R. Bayly (William Reynolds Bayly, 1867–1937), educator in South Australia